The Meadows is a historic home and farm compound located at Owings Mills, Baltimore County, Maryland, United States. The house is an L-shaped -story stone house built in the 18th century and occupied for approximately 80 years by various members of the Owings family, for whom Owings Mills was named. Also on the property is a -story stone slave house, an 18th-century stone and timber stable, and a 2-story log and clapboard tenant house.

The Meadows was listed on the National Register of Historic Places in 1988.

Gallery

References

External links
, including photo from 1987, at Maryland Historical Trust

African-American history of Baltimore County, Maryland
Houses in Baltimore County, Maryland
Houses on the National Register of Historic Places in Maryland
Buildings and structures in Owings Mills, Maryland
National Register of Historic Places in Baltimore County, Maryland
Plantations in Maryland